Alfred Bielschowsky (December 11, 1871 – April 5, 1940) was a German ophthalmologist. His specialty was physiology and pathology of the eye, particularly in regards to research of eye movement, space perception and diagnosis of oculomotor anomalies.

Bielschowsky was born in Namslau (Namysłów), Prussian Silesia. After attending the Königliches Katholisches Gymnasium of Glatz (Kłodzko), he studied medicine at the University of Breslau (Wrocław) and at the University of Heidelberg. At Heidelberg he was a student of ophthalmologist Theodor Leber (1840-1917). Afterwards he studied medicine at the University of Berlin, attending the lectures of Karl Ernst Theodor Schweigger (1830-1905) and graduating in 1893. He received his medical license in Leipzig on March 1 of the same year.

Bielschowsky subsequently studied and worked in the eye clinic at the University of Leipzig, receiving his habilitation in 1900 and becoming head physician of the clinic in 1906. While at Leipzig he worked under physiologist Ewald Hering (1834-1918), and with Franz Bruno Hofmann (1869-1926), he conducted studies of fusion and cyclodeviation in superior oblique muscle paresis. In 1912 Bielschowsky attained the chair of ophthalmology at the University of Marburg.

During World War I, Bielschowsky established a hospital ward and Braille instruction for treatment of blinded soldiers. In 1916, along with Carl Strehl (1886-1971), he founded the Verein blinder Akademiker Deutschlands (Association of Blinded Academics of Germany). For his war-time contributions, he was awarded the Iron Cross for War Aid from Paul von Hindenburg and honored with the title of Geheimer Medizinalrat (Privy Medical Counselor) by Wilhelm II, German Emperor.

In 1923 Bielschowsky was appointed chair of ophthalmology at the University of Breslau. While here, he published "Die Lähmungen der Augenmuskeln" (1932), an influential work on eye muscle disturbances.

Because of his Jewish heritage and Nazi persecution, Bielschowsky was fired from his position in 1934, later emigrating to the United States (1936). In 1937 he became head of the Dartmouth Eye Institute at Dartmouth College in Hanover, New Hampshire. However, he died suddenly in 1940.
During the same year his "Lectures on motor anomalies" was published.

Associated eponym
 Bielschowsky's head tilt test: A test for palsy of the superior oblique muscle caused by damage to cranial nerve IV (trochlear nerve).

References

 Ophthalmology Hall of Fame (Biography and Photo)
 Alfred Bielschowsky @ Who Named It

External links
 

1871 births
1940 deaths
People from Namysłów
Jewish emigrants from Nazi Germany to the United States
Geisel School of Medicine faculty
German ophthalmologists
German people of World War I
Humboldt University of Berlin alumni
People from the Province of Silesia
Recipients of the Iron Cross (1914)
Heidelberg University alumni
University of Breslau alumni
Academic staff of the University of Breslau
Leipzig University alumni
Academic staff of Leipzig University
Academic staff of the University of Marburg